The 14th Annual Gotham Independent Film Awards, presented by the Independent Filmmaker Project, were held on December 1, 2004. The nominees for Breakthrough Actor and Director were announced on November 1, 2004 and the nominees in the film categories were announced on November 10, 2004. The ceremony was hosted by Bob Balaban. It was the first Gotham Award ceremony where the prizes for Best Feature and Best Documentary were awarded.

Winners and nominees

Special awards

Celebrate New York Award
 Eternal Sunshine of the Spotless Mind

Gotham Tributes
 Don Cheadle
 Mike Leigh
 Michael Moore
 Dan Talbot

References

External links
 

2004
2004 film awards